The 2021–22 season was the 117th season in the existence of Arminia Bielefeld and the club's second consecutive season in the top flight of German football. Arminia started the season with three draws, but at the end of October, after only two draws out of seven matches in the league (and a defeat in the second round of the DFB-Pokal) they were in danger of even losing touch to the 16th rank. They started November with 1-0 win away over VfB Stuttgart, their first win in the whole Bundesliga season. That match sort of stabilized Arminias performance. They even won 2-0 away over RB Leipzig in December, and after a 2-2 draw against SpVgg Greuther Fürth in January they climbed up to the 16th rank after having been 17th for about three months. In February they even climbed up to the 14th rank after a 1-0 win over 1. FC Union Berlin. But this match was the last win in the season. Especially two draws and a defeat against the other relegation battlers FC Augsburg, VfB Stuttgart and Hertha BSC Berlin at home and a 4-0 defeat away at VfL Wolfsburg, at least partially a relegation battler in that season, let them fall to the 17th rank. They remained on the 17th rank even after the coach Frank Kramer was dismissed on 20 April and thus were relegated to the 2. Bundesliga.

Players

First-team squad

Out on loan

Transfers

In

Out

Pre-season and friendlies

Competitions

Overall record

Bundesliga

League table

Results summary

Results by round

Matches
The league fixtures were announced on 25 June 2021.

DFB-Pokal

References

Arminia Bielefeld seasons
Arminia Bielefeld